Józef Kowalski (2 February 1900? – 7 December 2013) was a Polish supercentenarian claimant, who was the last surviving military veteran of the Polish-Soviet War.

Biography

Kowalski was born in Wicyń, Galicia, Austria-Hungary (now Ukraine) and was a military veteran who served in the Polish Army in the 22nd Uhlan Regiment. He served in several important battles of the war, including the Battle of Warsaw and Battle of Komarów. In World War II, he took part in the September Campaign. After being captured he was held in a concentration camp. 

On 2 February 2010, his claimed 110th birthday, he was awarded the Officer's Cross of the Order of Polonia Restituta for his war service by Polish President Lech Kaczyński He lived in Tursk, near Sulęcin, in western Poland a care home. 

On 23 February 2012 Kowalski was promoted to the rank of kapitan, and on 16 August 2012 he was nominated to become an honorary citizen of the city of Wołomin, having already become an honorary citizen of both Warsaw and Radzymin.

Notes

Polish supercentenarians
Polish soldiers
Officers of the Order of Polonia Restituta
Polish people of the Polish–Soviet War
Polish military personnel of World War II
2013 deaths
Longevity claims